The James River is a  river in southern Missouri. It flows from northeast Webster County until it is impounded into Table Rock Lake. It is part of the White River watershed. The river forms Lake Springfield and supplies drinking water for the city of Springfield.

Course 
Its source is northeast of the town of Seymour in Webster County. Its headwaters initially flow south then turns west to northwesterly north of Seymour and turns southwest near Northview and passes down the east side of Springfield where it is impounded to form Lake Springfield. From Springfield, it flows west and then south past Galena where it enters Table Rock Lake, a reservoir on the White River.

Major tributaries into the James River include: Pierson Creek, Wilson Creek, Finley Creek, Crane Creek, and Flat Creek.

Recreation 
Large sections of the James River are floatable by canoe or kayak. A solid 3-day float from the public access on the downstream side of the dam to Galena is possible when the levels are high enough.

The James River is a source of drinking water for the city of Springfield. Lake Springfield is the primary source of water for the cooling system at the James River Power Plant which sits by the dam. The lake is a popular fishing and kayaking destination with docks and access points made by the Missouri Conservation Department. The river contains bass, catfish, crappie and bluegill. Four of the five world record Ozark bass were caught on the James River.

Dams 
The dam on the James River creates Lake Springfield and serves as the cooling reservoir for the James River Power Plant.

The river flows into the White River upstream from the hydroelectric Table Rock Dam, operated by the United States Army Corps of Engineers.

Name 
The name most likely is a transfer from the James River located in Virginia. James River Freeway on the Springfield's south side is named after the river.

References

Rivers of Missouri
Rivers of Greene County, Missouri
Rivers of Webster County, Missouri
Rivers of Christian County, Missouri
Rivers of Stone County, Missouri
Geography of Springfield, Missouri
Bodies of water of the Ozarks
Bodies of water of Greene County, Missouri
Tributaries of the White River (Arkansas–Missouri)